Waldemar Jaskulski (born 23 April 1967) is a Polish footballer. He played in thirteen matches for the Poland national football team from 1993 to 1996.

References

External links
 

1967 births
Living people
Polish footballers
Poland international footballers
Association football defenders
People from Sępólno Krajeńskie
RKS Radomsko players
Standard Liège players
Widzew Łódź players
Pogoń Szczecin players
RFC Liège players